Lusitano Futebol Clube, often known as Lusitano VRSA, is a Portuguese football club from Vila Real de Santo António, in the Algarve region. The club was founded on 15 April 1916 and is the No. 1 delegation of S.L. Benfica, and has Miguel Ângelo Machado Vairinhos as its current president. In the 2016–2017 season they competed in Campeonato de Portugal (third tier of Portuguese football pyramid) and their head coach is Ricardo Sousa. The team played in the main Portuguese football competition, the Portuguese Liga, for three seasons, in 1947–48, 1948–49 and 1949–50.

Stadium 
The stadium where the club plays is called Campo de Jogos Francisco Gomes Socorro and has the capacity for 2500 spectators but in certain games such as matches in the Algarve Cup, they play at Complexo Desportivo Municipal de Vila Real de Santo António, with capacity for 7500 spectators.

Current squad

Former players

  Alireza Jamali
  Arash Ostovari
  Harry Singh

Equipment and sponsorship 

Lusitano Futebol Clube are currently sponsored by CPA - Companhia de Pescarias do Algarve and their kit is made by Strike.

Honours 

First Division – 3 Appearances – Best Result: 12th Place

Algarve Regional League – 9 Titles (1922/23, 1927/28, 1928/29, 1929/30, 1931/32, 1934/35, 1954/55, 1977/78, 2011/12)

References 

 
Association football clubs established in 1913
Primeira Liga clubs
Liga Portugal 2 clubs
Sport in Algarve
1913 establishments in Portugal
Football clubs in Portugal